The 2002 Western Michigan Broncos football team represented Western Michigan University in the Mid-American Conference (MAC) during the 2002 NCAA Division I-A football season.  In their sixth season under head coach Gary Darnell, the Broncos compiled a 4–8 record (3–5 against MAC opponents), finished in fifth place in the MAC's West Division, and were outscored by their opponents, 330 to 303.  The team played its home games in Waldo Stadium in Kalamazoo, Michigan.

The team's statistical leaders included Chad Munson with 2,160 passing yards, Philip Reed with 1,053 rushing yards, and Jermaine Lewis with 654 receiving yards.

Schedule

Roster

References

Western Michigan
Western Michigan Broncos football seasons
Western Michigan Broncos football